Ayrton Badovini (born 31 May 1986) is an Italian motorcycle racer.

Biography

Career statistics

Superbike World Championship

By season

Races by year
(key) (Races in bold indicate pole position; races in italics indicate fastest lap)

Supersport World Championship

Races by year
(key)

References

External links
 Rider profile at Worldsbk.com
 
 

1986 births
Living people
Italian motorcycle racers
Superbike World Championship riders
FIM Superstock 1000 Cup riders
People from Biella
Supersport World Championship riders
Sportspeople from the Province of Biella